Jin Rui (born 25 June 1998) is a Chinese footballer currently playing as a midfielder for Quanzhou Yassin.

Club career
In 2018 Jin Haoxiang would be promoted to the senior team of Zhejiang before he would be loaned out to third tier club Fujian Tianxin to gain more playing time. The move would become permanent the following season until on 3 February 2020, the club was disqualified for the 2020 China League Two season after they failed to submit the salary and bonus confirmation form. Jin returned to Zhejiang as he would be a squad player as the club gained promotion to the top tier at the end of the 2021 campaign. Jin was allowed to join third tier club Quanzhou Yassin for the start of the 2022 China League Two campaign.

Career statistics
.

References

External links
Rui Jin at Worldfootball.net

1998 births
Living people
Chinese footballers
Association football midfielders
China League Two players
China League One players
Zhejiang Professional F.C. players